Arhopala aberrans, the pale bush blue, is a butterfly in the family Lycaenidae. It was described by Lionel de Niceville in 1889. It is found in the Indomalayan realm where it is recorded in Sikkim, Assam, Burma and China.

References

External links
Arhopala Boisduval, 1832 at Markku Savela's Lepidoptera and Some Other Life Forms. Retrieved June 3, 2017.

Arhopala
Butterflies described in 1889